Yartsevo is a rural locality (a village) in Vozhbalskoye Rural Settlement, Totemsky  District, Vologda Oblast, Russia. The population was 3 as of 2002.

Geography 
Yartsevo is located 38 km southwest of Totma (the district's administrative centre) by road. Ivanovskaya is the nearest rural locality.

References 

Rural localities in Totemsky District